Conduit Street is a street in Mayfair, London. It connects Bond Street to Regent Street.

History
The street was first developed in the early 18th century on the Conduit Mead Estate, which the Corporation of London had owned since the 15th century; it was a popular place for upper-class Londoners to socialise. Most properties have since been demolished and rebuilt, but a handful have survived.

The MP Charles James Fox was born on Conduit Street in 1749.

Properties
 No. 9 Conduit Street was built for the MP Robert Vyner in 1779. It was built by James Wyatt and is now Grade II* listed. The building served as the headquarters of the Royal Institute of British Architects from 1859 until 1934.
 No. 16 Conduit Street was a public house (The Coach & Horses) from the 1780s until at least 1910. The current building dates from 1900. 
 Nos. 19 and 20 are on the site of Warne's Hotel, destroyed by a fire on the afternoon of 29th January, 1809. It extended to the back premises, close to the gates of St George's Church, Hanover Square, which was thought to be under threat from the fire.
 Nos. 42 and 43 are listed early to mid 18th century terraced houses.
 No. 44 was the London office of the Oxford University Press Music Department in the 1950s.

References
Citations

Sources

Edwardian architecture
Shopping streets in London
Streets in the City of Westminster